For elections in the European Union, East France is a European Parliament constituency. It consists of the regions of Grand Est, and Bourgogne-Franche-Comté.

Results

2009

2004

Brackets indicate the number of votes per seat won.

Notes

External links
 European Election News by European Election Law Association (Eurela)

Former European Parliament constituencies in France
Politics of Grand Est
Politics of Bourgogne-Franche-Comté
Elections in Alsace
Elections in Champagne-Ardenne
Elections in Franche-Comté